Big Burros National Forest was established by the U.S. Forest Service in New Mexico on February 6, 1907  with .  On June 18, 1908 Big Burros was combined with Gila National Forest and the name was discontinued. 

The lands presently form an isolated section of Gila National Forest, encompassing the Big Burro Mountains to the west of Silver City, New Mexico in the Silver City Ranger District.

References

External links
Forest History Society
Listing of the National Forests of the United States and Their Dates (from the Forest History Society website) Text from Davis, Richard C., ed. Encyclopedia of American Forest and Conservation History. New York: Macmillan Publishing Company for the Forest History Society, 1983. Vol. II, pp. 743-788.

Former National Forests of New Mexico
Protected areas of Grant County, New Mexico
Protected areas established in 1907
1907 establishments in New Mexico Territory
1908 disestablishments in New Mexico Territory
Protected areas disestablished in 1908